École Française de Harare or Groupe Scolaire Jean de La Fontaine is a French international school in Vainona, Harare, Zimbabwe. Registered with the Agency for French Education Abroad (AEFE), it serves preschool to the upper secondary (lycée) levels. As of 2015 the school has 170 students from 27 countries.

Students taking upper secondary classes use the National Centre for Distance Education (CNED) distance education programme.

See also
 List of schools in Zimbabwe
 List of international schools

References

External links
 Groupe Scolaire Jean de La Fontaine
 Groupe Scolaire Jean de La Fontaine

International schools in Zimbabwe
Schools in Harare
Harare
High schools in Zimbabwe